This is a list of all the yachts built by Abeking & Rasmussen, sorted by year.



Table

Under construction

See also
 List of large sailing yachts
 List of motor yachts by length
 Luxury yacht
 Sailing yacht

References

Abeking & Rasmussen
Built by Abeking and Rasmussen
Built by Abeking and Rasmussen
Abeking & Rasmussen